The Republic of the Congo includes six communes, divided in urban districts (arrondissements). Two of these communes, Brazzaville and Pointe-Noire, are also a department:

Bouenza: Nkayi
Brazzaville: Brazzaville
Cuvette : none
Cuvette-Ouest: none
Lékoumou: none
Likouala:  none
Niari : Dolisie and Mossendjo
Plateaux: none
Pointe-Noire: Pointe-Noire
Pool: none
Sangha: Ouésso

See also 
Districts of the Republic of the Congo
Departments of the Republic of the Congo
ISO 3166-2:CG

References

 
Subdivisions of the Republic of the Congo
Congo, Republic of, Communes
Republic of the Congo geography-related lists